Get Scared is the second EP by American rock band Get Scared, released on November 9, 2010 on Amazon and iTunes as a digital download only. Two of the songs from the EP, "Sarcasm" and "Voodoo" were re-released on Get Scared's debut album Best Kind of Mess. The third song, "Deepest Cut", is exclusive to this EP only.

Reception 

Erik Rojas from The Sound Alarm site gave the EP a 7.5/10 rating stating that, "This three song EP is overall solid, and it blends many forms of music together, to create a diverse sound, which can be hard to find in today's scene."
Metal Odyssey reviewed the EP stating, "It's the multi-combination of this band's aggressive Hard Rock moments, moxie, unbridled relevance, harmonious vocals and the unfailing melodic nature of these three songs that makes this EP and Get Scared notably memorable" giving it a positive 4/5 rating.
Cyndi Jo of Hardrock Haven gave another positive rating of 8/10 stating, "The songs are solid with elements of post-hardcore with the screamo-whatever-core that fans have maintained popular. As far as guitar work and hard hitting vocal tactics go, it's there, but it's definitely time for the whole thing."

Track listing

Personnel 
Get Scared
Nicholas Matthews – lead vocals
Jonathan "Johnny B" Braddock – lead guitar and bass
Bradley "Lloyd" Iverson - rhythm guitar
Dan Juarez - drums, percussion
Additional
Craig Mabbit - guest vocals on "Sarcasm"
Erik Ron - engineer

References 

2010 EPs
Get Scared albums